The Best Science Fiction Stories and Novels: 1956 is a 1956 anthology of science fiction short stories edited by T. E. Dikty.  The stories had originally appeared in 1955 and 1956 in the magazines Startling Stories, Astounding, Galaxy Science Fiction, Imaginative Tales, Fantastic Universe, Fantasy and Science Fiction and If.

Contents

 The Science-Fiction Year, by T. E. Dikty
 "Jungle Doctor", by Robert F. Young
 "Judgment Day", by L. Sprague de Camp
 "The Game of Rat and Dragon", by Cordwainer Smith
 "The Man Who Always Knew", by Algis Budrys
 "Dream Street", by Frank M. Robinson
 "You Created Us", by Tom Godwin
 "Swenson, Dispatcher", by R. DeWitt Miller
 "Thing", by Ivan Janvier
 "I Do Not Love Thee, Doctor Fell", by Robert Bloch
 "Clerical Error", by Mark Clifton
 "A Canticle for Leibowitz", by Walter M. Miller, Jr.
 "The Cyber and Justice Holmes", by Frank Riley
 "The Shores of Night", by Thomas N. Scortia
 The Science-Fiction Book Index, by Earl Kemp

References

1956 anthologies
Best Science Fiction Stories 1956